Morningstar Air Express Inc. is a cargo airline based in Edmonton, Alberta, Canada. It operates a contract all-cargo service from Halifax to Vancouver for FedEx Express within Canada, as well as all-cargo charter services. Its main base is Edmonton International Airport.

History
The airline was founded in Edmonton in 1970 as Brooker-Wheaton Aviation Ltd. In January, 1992 the company became Morningstar Air Express. It is owned by Donald Wheaton (37.5%), Kim Ward (37.5%), and Bill McGoey (25%).

It was founded in Edmonton in 1970 by two Edmonton businessmen, Don Wheaton, Sr. and Bev Brooker. The company enjoyed rapid growth due to the "oil boom" economy of Alberta during the 1970s. During this period, the company expanded into a Cessna sales, service and parts centre, a fuel dealership and a full service fixed-base operator (FBO) centre. Company flying activities initially involved cabin class piston and turboprop twins. In the late 1970s, the company added a Learjet 36 and a Hawker Siddeley HS.125 to its fleet.

In the early 1980s, the company divested of its piston fleet, continued to expand its turboprop and corporate jet fleet and went into aircraft leasing business. Also, during this period, Don Wheaton, Sr. became the sole shareholder of Brooker Wheaton Aviation Ltd. During the mid-1980s, the company began flying for various courier companies. Brooker Aviation Ltd. expanded in this market in subsequent years with the addition of Fairchild Metroliners and Cessna 208 Caravans. In July 1990, the company acquired a contract to initially operate two Boeing 727s nationwide for FedEx Express Canada. November 1991 saw the addition of the Fokker F-27 aircraft for the FedEx Express Canada contract. Brooker Wheaton Aviation's expertise grew substantially in the early 1990s when the Max Ward family purchased half of the company after selling Wardair. At that time the name was changed to Morningstar Express when Don Wheaton Jr. and Kim Ward joined forces. In January 2013, Bill McGoey (President) purchased 25% of the company. The company has expanded to 22 all-cargo aircraft flying coast-to-coast in scheduled daily cargo service.

Destinations
Morningstar Air Express Inc. operates a contract all-cargo service for FedEx Express between the following cities: Victoria, Vancouver, Nanaimo, Edmonton, Calgary, Winnipeg, Thunder Bay, Sault Ste Marie, Sudbury, North Bay, Timmins, Toronto, Montreal, Quebec City, Moncton, and Halifax.

Fleet

As of November 2022, Morningstar Air Express has the following 22 aircraft registered with Transport Canada. However, according to the company they have 17 aircraft. All aircraft are leased and operating for FedEx Express

Accidents and incidents
On October 6, 2005, a Cessna 208B Super Cargomaster (C-FEXS) crashed shortly after takeoff from Winnipeg, Manitoba on a freight operations flight. The aircraft experienced icing conditions and was loaded beyond the weight category maximum for flight in icing conditions. The pilot lost control of the aircraft, which crashed on railroad tracks in Winnipeg. The pilot, who was the only occupant, was killed in the crash.

Marie Airport in Ontario near the Canada–United States border. Part of the aircraft's underbelly cargo pod was recovered from the sea but the pilot, who was the only occupant, was never found.

References

External links

Morningstar Air Express

Cargo airlines of Canada
Air Transport Association of Canada
Airlines established in 1970
Regional airlines of Alberta